President of the Quorum of the Twelve Apostles is a priesthood calling in the Church of Jesus Christ of Latter-day Saints (LDS Church). Normally, the President of the Quorum of the Twelve is the most senior apostle in the church, aside from the President of the Church. When the President of the Church dies, it is the President of the Quorum of the Twelve who becomes the new church president. The calling of President of the Twelve has been held by 27 men (one of whom served two non-consecutive terms), 16 of whom have gone on to become President of the Church. The current President of the Quorum of the Twelve is Dallin H. Oaks. Since Oaks is a counselor in the First Presidency, M. Russell Ballard is currently serving as acting president.

History of the Presidency of the Quorum of the Twelve
Upon the death of the President of the Church, the First Presidency automatically dissolves, leaving the Twelve Apostles as the highest leadership body and their President as the highest official in the church. On the death of church president Joseph Smith in 1844, this position was held by Brigham Young, and he persuaded the majority of church members that Smith's death left him and not Sidney Rigdon, who had been Smith's First Counselor in the First Presidency, as the senior leader. Smith had reportedly taught the apostles, "Where I am not, there is no First Presidency over the Twelve."

In 1847, the Quorum of the Twelve reconstituted the First Presidency, with Young as church president. During Young's presidency, seniority within the Quorum of the Twelve was formalized to mean "continuous service as an Apostle since being ordained as one of the Twelve". The original apostles of 1835 had been ranked by age, and two of them had been excommunicated and later restored to fellowship. With this rule in place, it was John Taylor who led the church after Young's death in 1877, first as President of the Twelve and after 1880 as President of the Church with Wilford Woodruff as President of the Twelve.

After Taylor died in 1887, Woodruff did not reorganize the First Presidency until 1889. But before his own death in 1898, he advised the Quorum of the Twelve that "in all future time, when the President of the Church should die and thereby the First Presidency become disorganized, it would be the duty of the proper authorities of the Church to proceed at once without any unnecessary delay, to reorganize the First Presidency." Snow followed this advice and since then every interval between the death of the President of the Church and the ordination of a new president has been less than two weeks, long enough to complete the funeral services and allow for the Quorum of the Twelve to nominate and sustain the President of the Twelve as the new church president. When the President of the Twelve becomes the President of the Church, the next apostle in seniority becomes the new President of the Twelve.

Duties
The President of the Quorum of the Twelve Apostles is the priesthood leader of the members of the Quorum. As such, all members of the Quorum report directly to him. The president's other duties consist of presiding at and conducting weekly meetings of the Quorum in the Salt Lake Temple; making decisions about the particular assignments to be made to the members of the Quorum; speaking on behalf of the Quorum to members of the church and the media; scheduling twice-annual conferences for each stake and district in the church; and acting as a liaison in coordinating the work of the Quorum with the First Presidency, the Quorums of the Seventy, and the Presiding Bishopric.

When adherents refer to the President of the Quorum of the Twelve, his name is usually prefaced by the honorific title "President".

Acting President

If the President of the Quorum of the Twelve Apostles is asked to become a counselor in the First Presidency, the President of the Quorum retains that title but is not numbered among the Twelve, and the most senior apostle who is not in the First Presidency is named as Acting President of the Quorum of the Twelve Apostles. The Acting President assumes all of the duties that would normally rest upon the President of the Quorum. The title of Acting President was first used in 1918 for Rudger Clawson. The position has also been used during times of infirmity of a President of the Twelve: for example, Howard W. Hunter was Acting President for the infirm Marion G. Romney from 1985 to 1988.

Boyd K. Packer was the Acting President of the Quorum of the Twelve Apostles from 1994 to 2008 when Gordon B. Hinckley and Thomas S. Monson were presidents of the Quorum but also in the First Presidency.

On January 16, 2018, the church announced that due to the call of Dallin H. Oaks as a counselor in the First Presidency, M. Russell Ballard would serve as Acting President.

List of presidents of the Quorum of the Twelve

Notes

1835 establishments in the United States
1835 in Christianity
Latter Day Saint hierarchy
Leadership positions in the Church of Jesus Christ of Latter-day Saints
 
President
Quorum of the Twelve Apostles